Tugimaantee 17 (ofcl. abbr. T17), also called the Keila–Haapsalu highway, is a 68.8-kilometre-long national basic road in northwestern Estonia. The highway begins at Keila on national road 8 and ends at Haapsalu on national road 9.

Route
T17 passes through the following counties and municipalities:
Harju County
Keila
Lääne-Harju Parish
Lääne County
Lääne-Nigula Parish

See also
 Transport in Estonia

References

External links

N17